The 2016–17 CD Leganés season is the club's 89th season in its history and its first in La Liga, the top-flight of Spanish football.

Current squad

Transfers 

In:

Out:

Competitions

Overall

Liga

League table

Matches

Copa del Rey

Round of 32

References

CD Leganés seasons
Leganes